Richard Carte (23 February 1808 – 1891) was an English flute-maker, flautist and composer. One of his sons was the impresario Richard D'Oyly Carte, producer of the Gilbert and Sullivan operas.

Life
Carte was born in Silchester, Hampshire. He studied with George Rudall on an eight key "Nicholson" flute. By 1824 he was giving regular concerts in London both as soloist and orchestra player. He married the former Eliza Jones (1814–1885); they had eloped, to the disappointment of her father, Thomas Jones, a clergyman. Two of his six children, Henry W. Carte (1856–1926) and Richard D'Oyly Carte, were both to become important in their own fields: the first as flute-maker and the second for staging the Gilbert and Sullivan comic operas. The other children were Blanch (1846–1935), Viola (1848–1925), Rose (1854–1940) and Eliza (1860–1941).

Richard Carte was a popular lecturer on the development of the flute and was secretary of the newly founded "London Society of Amateur Flautists" in 1866. He was friend of Louis Spohr, and in 1843 was a member of Jullien's famous band. At the height of his career (1844) he adopted Theobald Boehm's flute with the open G-sharp, and two years later brought out a manual for it, the copyright for which he sold for £100. His best known flute pupil was Richard Shepherd Rockstro.

In 1850 he became a partner at the prominent flute-making firm of Rudall, Rose & Co., instigating many improvements and additions to Boehm's systems, all of which culminated in his popular 1867 model. After he became a partner in the business, it changed its name to Rudall, Rose, Carte and Co. and later to Rudall, Carte & Co.

Compositions
Complete Instruction for the Boehm flute (1845)
Concertants Duets for two flutes
Fantasias
Grands Solos for flute and piano

Notes

References
Fairley, Andrew (1982). Flutes, Flautists and Makers. London: Pan Educational Music. 140 pp.

External links

1808 births
1891 deaths
Flute makers
19th-century British people
19th-century classical composers
English male classical composers
English classical composers
19th-century English musicians
19th-century British composers
19th-century British male musicians